Nike Dobrovits (born 2 December 1973) is an Austrian former professional tennis player.

Active on tour in the late 1980s early 1990s, Dobrovits reached a career best singles ranking of 218. She made two WTA Tour singles main draw appearances at the Austrian Open, as a qualifier in 1990 and wildcard entrant in 1992. Her biggest title was a $25,000 ITF tournament in Jakarta, which she won in 1992 over Hiromi Nagano in the final.

Dobrovits now works as an ophthalmologist in Vienna.

ITF finals

Singles: 2 (1–1)

References

External links
 
 

1973 births
Living people
Austrian female tennis players